The Historical Museum of St. James – Assiniboia is a museum in Winnipeg, Manitoba, Canada. The museum primarily consists of a two-story post-and-plank house built in 1856 and once owned by William Brown and Charlotte Omand. The home is furnished with pieces from the period between 1860 and 1890.

The museum also features two other buildings: the Municipal Hall Building built in 1911 which contains exhibits from the St. James-Assiniboia area and surrounding parishes and an auxiliary building which features exhibits concerning blacksmithing, farming, and transportation.

Affiliations
The Museum is affiliated with: CMA,  CHIN, and Virtual Museum of Canada.

References

Association of Manitoba Museums
Virtual Museums Canada

Museums in Winnipeg
History museums in Manitoba

St. James, Winnipeg
Municipal Historical Resources of Winnipeg
Assiniboia Municipal Hall